Utena is a city in north-east Lithuania. It is the administrative center of Utena district and Utena County. Utena is one of the oldest settlements of Lithuania. The name of the city is most probably derived from a hydronym. The name of the settlement has been known since 1261.

Utena is an industrial city. It is known for its clothing, food and beverage factories. In recent years, however, streets, public squares and large areas of the parks in the city were reconstructed and Utena is now more attractive for recreation and tourism. In 2007, Utena won a Silver Award in category B (towns with a population between 10,001 and 50,000) of the International Awards for Liveable Communities, held in London.

The anniversary of Utena City had been held each year on the last weekend of September. Since 2013 the anniversary has been held on the first weekend of September to take advantage of better weather conditions.

Geography 

Utena is located in northeastern Lithuania. The city covers 15.1 km2 and is the eighth-largest city by area in Lithuania. Four rivers cross the city territory: Vyžuona, Krašuona, Vieša and Utenėlė. There are also two lakes in Utena, Dauniškis and Vyžuonaitis.

Districts 
The city is divided into 10 districts:
 Aukštakalnis
 Ąžuolija
 Centras (Center)
 Dauniškis
 Pramonės rajonas (Industrial district)
 Rašė
 Vyturiai
 Šilinė
 Grybeliai
 Krašuona

Parks and gardens 

 City Garden
 Vyžuona Park
 Dauniškis Park
 Krašuona Park
 Aukštakalnis Pine Forest
 Rašė Park
 Utenėlė Park
 Vieša Park
 Monkey park

Climate
The lowest temperature ever recorded in Lithuania occurred in Utena (-42,9 °C in 1956-02-01).

History 

Utena was first mentioned in historical documents dating back to 1261. The settlement was a major center of Nalšia. It was part of the Grand Duchy of Lithuania until 1795, when it fell under Czarist Russian rule. From 1802 it belonged to the Vilna Governorate until 1843 when it became a part of the Kovno Governorate. The town grew rapidly after the St.Petersburg-Warsaw road was constructed between 1830 and 1835. In 1899 a narrow gauge railway line, connecting Panevėžys-Utena-Švenčionys, was constructed. At the end of the 19th century two big fires devastated the town.

Germany occupied Utena from 1915 to 1918, until the Soviet Bolsheviks took over. In June 1919, Utena became a district center in independent Lithuania.

Utena, known as the shtetl Utyan in Yiddish, historically had a Jewish population.

Demography

Population

Sport 
FK Utenis Utena plays in A Lyga and BC Juventus plays in LKL.

Hometown of Jonas Valančiūnas of the New Orleans Pelicans.

Aidenas Malašinskas is the best handball player in Lithuania (2019, 2021).

Twin towns – sister cities

Utena is twinned with:

 Chełm, Poland
 Kovel, Ukraine
 Lidköping, Sweden
 Pontinia, Italy
 Preiļi, Latvia
 Rēzekne, Latvia
 Třeboň, Czech Republic
 Beit Sahour, Palestine

References

External links 

 Official site
 Encyclopedia of Utena: Summary

 
Cities in Utena County
Capitals of Lithuanian counties
Cities in Lithuania
Municipalities administrative centres of Lithuania
Vilkomirsky Uyezd
Holocaust locations in Lithuania
Utena District Municipality